Jack Gerrard (born 18 October 1994) is an Australian swimmer. He competed in the men's 200 metre freestyle event at the 2018 FINA World Swimming Championships (25 m), in Hangzhou, China.

References

External links
 

1994 births
Living people
Australian male freestyle swimmers
Place of birth missing (living people)
Medalists at the FINA World Swimming Championships (25 m)
20th-century Australian people
21st-century Australian people